Halaka is an American experimental noise rock band that originated in the early 1980s. They have independently released nearly 40 albums in various formats and through various channels.

Discography
 Gelatin, Slightly Used (1981)
 Gelatin, Slightly Live (1982)
 Purple Eon (1982)
 Trashe (1983) - cassette
 Here's Some Mud (1984)
 On a Hillside (1985)
 Disillusioned but the Ring's Pretty (1985)
 Up to See God (1986)
 To Egypt, Some Sand (1987) (as Ahkala)
 Halaka (1988)
 Halaka (1988)
 Flabbergastastrophe (1990)
 Stout Fish (1990)
 Hearty Leper (1990)
 The Mackerel Self (1990)
 Water You Talking About? (1991)
 SteadyState (as Ahkala) (1991)
 Ticker Tape Charade (as Ahkala) (1992)
 Apple Leisha (1993)
 Melted Appled (1993)
 Fantastic T-shirt Juice (1993)
 State of Taking Over (1993)
 Mad Bug (1994)
 Angrier Bug (as Ahkala) (1994)
 Madder Bug (1994)
 MazeMindInsectTrap (1994)
 Tulip (1995)
 Inside the Drowned Nothing is Nothing Drowned the Inside (1985)
 Live Arabic Sex Show (1996)
 Dime Store Bible (1997)
 Sasha (1997)
 The Rise and Fall of Flightless Birds (1997)
 And Kind Ladies Are Heaving About (As Ahkala) (1997)
 Incidentally... (1998)
 Inadequate (1999)
 God the Lunatic (1999)
 God, I Am the Lunatic (2000)
 A Translucent Gold Statue, A Hole (2001)
 A Skintight Malevolence (2002)
 Diluted Years Concentrate (2004)
 The Margarine Committee's Unauthorized Business Plan (2007)
 The Voice Over the Intercom Says Hello (2008)
 Unabridged Discord (2008)
 Presenting the Making of Shave Your Regular Face (2008)
 888 (2009)
 split cassette with Appalachian Yard Art (2011)
 The Fifth of the Second of the Fifth (2012)
 That Crowded Morning Feeling (2012)
 The Lunatics have Fallen Under the Asylum (2012)
 Swalaka (2014, Phase Velocity, split tape with Simon Waldram)

Band members

Current members
 Sacky Jamboree
 *
 Fanch Taylor
 Kingo Sleemer
 Apertome
 Madhog

Past members
 Eugene Matsumura
 Shank
 Miss Mackerel
 Super Ryan
 The Mysterious F
 Lacky Daisical
 Drewb
 Stick

Visuals
The visuals for multiple Halaka releases, including MazeMindInsectTrap and Unabridged Discord, featured artwork by an English illustrator named Spookytim, who operates from a studio in Brighton called Studiospooky.

Reviews and links
Halaka has been reviewed in several online publications. 
 https://web.archive.org/web/20080625010120/http://news.dmusic.com/article/25652 - 2007 dmusic interview with halaka
 https://web.archive.org/web/20080724200827/http://news.dmusic.com/article/25653 - part two of 2007 dmusic interview
 http://www.splendidezine.com/review.html?reviewid=32410068183532013 - 2002 review of A Translucent Gold Statue, a Hole.
 http://www.indieville.com/reviews/halaka.htm - 2003 review from Individual of A Translucent Gold Statue, a Hole.
 http://www.halaka.org - official website
 http://www.pilerecords.com - official site of band's label
 http://www.apertome.com/blog/category/music/halaka/ - info on the band's 2007 FAWM project
 http://www.halaka.org/FAWM2007/TMCUBP.php - link to the audio of 2007 FAWM project

American experimental musical groups
American progressive rock groups
Musical groups from Maryland